Dolores Airport may refer to:

 Dolores Airport (Argentina)
 Dolores Airport (Philippines)